Space (1965) is an underground film directed by Andy Warhol, written by Ronald Tavel, and starring Edie Sedgwick, Gino Piserchio, Dorothy Dean, Ed Hennessey, singer-songwriter Eric Andersen, and Norman Levine. Unlike many of Warhol's other films made at The Factory, this film involved a moving camera, moving around the actors as they stood still.

Plot
The film features a melange of casual talking, food fights, and folk singing. The film includes Eric Andersen with his guitar, singing his lines, and leading Edie Sedgwick and her friends in unscripted sing-alongs of popular songs including "Puff the Magic Dragon" and "The Battle Hymn of the Republic".

See also
Andy Warhol filmography

References

External links
Space at IMDB
Space at WarholStars

1965 films
Films directed by Andy Warhol
American independent films
1960s English-language films
1960s American films